The 2021 Foxwoods Resort Casino 301 was a NASCAR Cup Series race held on July 18, 2021, at New Hampshire Motor Speedway in Loudon, New Hampshire. Originally scheduled for 301 laps, the race was shortened to 293 laps due to darkness. on the  speedway. It was the 22nd race of the 2021 NASCAR Cup Series season. Aric Almirola led the last 28 laps to take a surprise victory, the third of his NASCAR Cup Series career, and his first on a non superspeedway.

Report

Background

New Hampshire Motor Speedway is a  oval speedway located in Loudon, New Hampshire, which has hosted NASCAR racing annually since the early 1990s, as well as the longest-running motorcycle race in North America, the Loudon Classic. Nicknamed "The Magic Mile", the speedway is often converted into a  road course, which includes much of the oval.

The track was originally the site of Bryar Motorsports Park before being purchased and redeveloped by Bob Bahre. The track is currently one of eight major NASCAR tracks owned and operated by Speedway Motorsports.

Entry list
 (R) denotes rookie driver.
 (i) denotes driver who are ineligible for series driver points.

Qualifying
Kyle Busch was awarded the pole for the race as determined by competition-based formula.

Starting Lineup

Race

Kyle Busch was awarded the pole. During the first few laps it began to rain and caused Busch to slam into the wall and others spun including Martin Truex Jr., and Alex Bowman. Busch would be unable to continue the race. The race was red flagged due to rain. When the race resumed, Joey Logano was penalized two laps for a crew member working on the car under the red flag. Bubba Wallace spun with a flat tire as Ryan Blaney won the first stage. Kevin Harvick would dominate, but Brad Keselowski won the second stage. In the closing laps, several laps were taken off of the distance due to darkness looming. Aric Almirola would take the lead from Matt DiBenedetto and hold off a charging Christopher Bell for the win, qualifying for the playoffs being 27th in points and needing a win to qualify.

Stage Results

Stage One
Laps: 75

Stage Two
Laps: 110

Final Stage Results

Stage Three
Laps: 116

NOTE:  Race shortened to 293 laps by darkness.

NOTE:  The 9 and 48 teams were penalised 25 points each on July 22, 2021, by NASCAR for an engine violation.  Teams are limited to 20 engines during the Cup Series season, as eight full engines, known as long blocks, and eight short blocks, consisting of the engine block, connecting rod, pistons, crankshaft, and camshaft, must be sealed and reused for a second race. As reported by Fox Sports' Bob Pockrass, special rules are in place when a team wins a race.  Such race winning engine is marked by a car number, and can only be reused by the same team that used the engine in the race win.  At this event, the 48 team used an engine previously raced by the 9 team at either Austin or Road America.  By rule, because it was a race winning engine, only the 9 team can reuse that sealed engine.  The infraction was discovered when the 48 engine in question was inspected and the 9 car tab was found.''

Race statistics
 Lead changes: 14 among 10 different drivers
 Cautions/Laps: 6 for 37
 Red flags: 1 for 1 hour, 41 minutes and 22 seconds
 Time of race: 3 hours, 7 minutes and 52 seconds
 Average speed:

Race recap 
Kyle Busch would jump to the lead on the start with Truex Jr. following. Throughout the start, light rain started to increase into heavier rain. In an accident similar to the start of the 2001 The Winston, on lap 6 rain picked up heavily in Turn 1, causing the leaders including Kyle Busch. Truex Jr., and Hamlin to all spin and collect damage. As rain picked up even further, NASCAR decided to stop the race on lap 9. Aric Almirola would win. The race did not run the full 300 laps due to sunset.

Media

Television
NBC Sports covered the race on the television side. Dale Earnhardt Jr., four-time and all-time Loudon winner Jeff Burton and Steve Letarte called the race from the broadcast booth. Marty Snider and Dillon Welch handled the pit road duties from pit lane.

Radio
PRN had the radio call for the race, which was also simulcast on Sirius XM NASCAR Radio. Doug Rice and Mark Garrow called the race from the booth when the field races down the frontstretch. Rob Albright called the race from turns 1 & 2 and Pat Patterson called the race from turns 3 & 4. Brad Gillie, Brett McMillan and Alan Cavanna handled the duties on pit lane.

Standings after the race

Drivers' Championship standings

Manufacturers' Championship standings

Note: Only the first 16 positions are included for the driver standings.  Points reflect penalties assessed on July 22, 2021.
. – Driver has clinched a position in the NASCAR Cup Series playoffs.

References

2021 Foxwoods Resort Casino 301
2021 NASCAR Cup Series
2021 in sports in New Hampshire
July 2021 sports events in the United States